Il Duce Canadese, aka Il duce canadese: Le Mussolini canadien (Canada: French title) is a Canadian television miniseries, which aired on CBC Television in 2004.

The series revolves around the Alvaro family, an Italian-Canadian family in Montreal during World War II whose lives are tested when family patriarch Angelo (Tony Nardi) is falsely arrested and imprisoned by the Royal Canadian Mounted Police as a national security threat.

The series' cast also includes Alexis Bélec, Ron Lea, Gerry Mendicino, Dino Tavarone, Marina Orsini and Carlo Rota.

External links

2000s Canadian television miniseries
2004 Canadian television series debuts
CBC Television original programming
Films directed by Giles Walker
Works about Italian-Canadian culture